Celsius Roskilde, formerly Alpine Eternity, is a Marshall Islands-registered oil and chemical tanker.

2015 Persian Gulf incident
On 14 May 2015, Iranian patrol boats intercepted Alpine Eternity as she transited the Strait of Hormuz and ordered her to sail into Iranian waters. When the ship's master refused, the patrol boats fired shots across the bow of the vessel, at which point the tanker shifted course to the territorial waters of the United Arab Emirates (UAE). The patrol boats then fired directly upon the tanker in attempt to disable her. Several shots hit the ship, but she was not disabled. The patrol boats pursued Alpine Eternity for nearly an hour as she headed for port in the UAE and they only broke off pursuit when UAE coast guard ships arrived on the scene.

The following day, an Iranian official said that Iran had attempted to seize Alpine Eternity because she had hit an Iranian oil rig on 22 March 2015, doing $300 million in damage, and the vessel's operator, Transpetrol, had not taken steps to pay compensation. Singapore, the country to which the vessel was registered, condemned Iran's action as "a serious violation of international law".

References

2009 ships
Ships of Singapore
Maritime incidents in 2015
International maritime incidents
Tankers